Rhagastis trilineata is a moth of the family Sphingidae. It is known from Japan.

References

Rhagastis
Moths described in 1921
Moths of Japan